Monika Vaiciukevičiūtė (born 3 April 1996) is a female professional race walker who competes internationally for Lithuania.

Her twin sister Živilė Vaiciukevičiūtė also competing in race walking.

Personal bests

References

1996 births
Living people
Lithuanian female racewalkers